The Cheesman's vlei rat (Otomys cheesmani) is a species of rodent in the family Muridae. It is considered endemic to northwestern Ethiopia.

Conservation 

It is possibly extinct and only known from two localities in Ethiopia, hence the assessment of the species as "Critically endangered" by the IUCN. Surveys done in 2012 and 2018 found no individuals of the species.

References

Mammals described in 2011
Mammals of Ethiopia